Davaleh-ye Sofla (also Romanized as Davāleh-ye Soflá; also known as Davāleh Pā’īn) is a village in Zamkan Rural District, in the Central District of Salas-e Babajani County, Kermanshah Province, Iran. At the 2006 census, its population was 45, in 11 families.

References 

Populated places in Salas-e Babajani County